Christopher Kelly (born November 11, 1980) is a Canadian former professional ice hockey player and current assistant coach for the Boston Bruins. Kelly played for the Ottawa Senators, Boston Bruins and Anaheim Ducks of the National Hockey League (NHL). He was a member of the Bruins' 2011 Stanley Cup-winning team.

He won gold with Team Canada at the 2017 Spengler Cup. In the 2018 Winter Olympics, Kelly represented Canada as captain of the men's ice hockey team, leading the team to a bronze medal.

Playing career

Amateur
Kelly was born in Toronto and grew up one hour east of the city in Bowmanville. He started playing in the Bowmanville  Recreational Hockey League and with the Bowmanville Toros AA program. He played in the 1994 Quebec International Pee-Wee Hockey Tournament with the Toronto Marlboros minor ice hockey team. For one year, he played for the OHA Jr. A. hockey with the Aurora Tigers. Kelly was then selected in the fourth round, 56th overall, by the Ontario Hockey League (OHL)'s London Knights in the 1997 OHL Priority Selection.

At the major junior level, Kelly played for both the Knights and the Sudbury Wolves. In 1998–99, he scored 36 goals, his career-high scoring mark in the OHL. He also played for the Team Orr in the mid-season at the CHL Top Prospects Game. In the OHL playoffs, he scored nine goals and 26 points in 25 games as the Knights reached the OHL Final.

Professional

Ottawa Senators
Kelly was drafted 94th overall by the Ottawa Senators in the 1999 NHL Entry Draft. He spent one year in the American Hockey League (AHL) with the Grand Rapids Griffins and three seasons in the same league with the Binghamton Senators. He also played with the Muskegon Fury (of the UHL) for four games (recovering from an injury). In 2004–05, he had finished fifth in the AHL in plus-minus with +30. He also finished fifth on Binghamton with 60 points, as the team finished fourth overall in the League. When he was a professional rookie in 2001–02, he helped the Griffins finish fourth in the AHL. In his two final seasons in Binghamton, Kelly served as team captain.

Kelly made his NHL debut on February 5, 2004, in a match against the Toronto Maple Leafs, one of four games he appeared in with Ottawa during 2003–04. In his rookie season of 2005–06, he became a regular in Ottawa's line-up, appearing in all of the team's 82 games and registering 30 points whilst playing in a checking role. The following season, he was a member of the Senators team that advanced to the 2007 Stanley Cup Finals.

On July 31, 2007, he re-signed with the Senators to a one-year contract worth $1.263 million. Kelly was set to become an unrestricted free agent on July 1, 2008, but again re-signed with the Senators on a four-year contract extension worth $8.5 million on June 20, 2008.

Boston Bruins
As part of a rebuilding process undertaken by the Senators as the 2010–11 season was concluding, Kelly was traded to the Boston Bruins on February 15, 2011, for a second-round draft pick in 2011; Ottawa later used the pick to select forward Shane Prince. Kelly and the Boston Bruins won the Stanley Cup, defeating the Vancouver Canucks.

On April 12, 2012, Kelly scored the game-winning goal in overtime in Game 1 of the Eastern Conference Quarterfinal series against the Washington Capitals; the Bruins ultimately lost the series in seven games.

A pending unrestricted free agent as the 2011–12 season wrapped up, Kelly was rumoured to be returning to the Senators, though he ended up re-signing with the Bruins on June 11, 2012, agreeing to a four-year, $12 million contract. The deal, however, was quickly rejected by the NHL due to what then-Bruins General Manager Peter Chiarelli referred to as "payroll tagging issues." Kelly stayed with the Bruins, and played in the 2013 Stanley Cup Finals.

As the 2013–14 season began on October 3, 2013, with a home game against the Tampa Bay Lightning, Kelly had his first-ever chance at a penalty shot in his NHL career in the first period of the game; he converted the penalty shot, scoring the first Bruins goal of the season against goaltender Anders Lindbäck while the Bruins were in a short-handed situation en route to an eventual 3–1 home victory. The goal marked the first time in NHL history that a team scored its first goal of the season via a penalty shot.

In his sixth year with the Bruins in the 2015–16 season, and in the final year of his contract, Kelly began the campaign leading the Bruins penalty-kill. Kelly scored 2 goals in 11 games before on November 3, 2015, he buckled his left leg on the ice and broke his left femur in a game against the Dallas Stars. He was announced to have undergone surgery the following day and was scheduled to have a 6-8 month recovery period, which effectively ruled him out for the season.

Return to Ottawa
As a free agent following his recovery from his broken leg with the Bruins, Kelly signed a one-year contract to return to the Ottawa Senators on July 7, 2016. In the 2016–17 season, Kelly appeared in all 82 games for the club, scoring 12 points.

Later career and Anaheim Ducks
At the conclusion of his contract, Kelly was not re-signed by the Senators, making him an unrestricted free agent. Unsigned over the summer, the Edmonton Oilers signed Kelly to a professional tryout on September 9, 2017. Kelly attended the Oilers training camp and pre-season and remained with the club to start the 2017–18 season. Despite practicing with the team, Kelly was not offered a contract with the Oilers and on November 24, 2017, he returned within the Senators organization by signing a professional tryout deal with new AHL affiliate, the Belleville Senators.

On January 9, 2018, following his performance with Team Canada at the Spengler Cup, Kelly was re-signed to a professional tryout agreement with the Belleville Senators.

At the conclusion of the Olympics, Kelly returned to the NHL in agreeing to a one-year, $1.25 million contract for the remainder of the season with the Anaheim Ducks on February 25, 2018. He appeared in just 12 games to play out the regular season, posting two assists.

Coaching career
On September 4, 2018, Kelly was hired by the Senators as a development coach, effectively ending his playing career. Kelly joined former Senators' teammate Shean Donovan in overseeing and supporting the development of prospects throughout the Ottawa system.

On August 13, 2021, Kelly was hired as an assistant coach by the Boston Bruins.

International play

Spengler Cup
On December 20, 2017, Kelly was released from his professional tryout agreement with the Belleville Senators to join Team Canada for the 2017 Spengler Cup, which they won. He rejoined the Senators immediately following the tournament.

Olympics
On January 11, 2018, Kelly was named to Team Canada for the 2018 Winter Olympics. He was named team captain on February 8, 2018. Kelly, and Team Canada won the bronze medal, defeating the Czech Republic 6–4.

Personal life
Kelly married during the summer of 2008 in Mexico. He met his wife Krissy Broderick while attending Saunders Secondary School as a member of the London Knights as a teenager. Broderick now teaches elementary school in Ottawa.

Career statistics

Regular season and playoffs

International

References

External links
 
 Chris Kelly's biography at NHLPA.com

1980 births
Anaheim Ducks players
Belleville Senators players
Binghamton Senators players
Boston Bruins players
Canadian ice hockey forwards
Grand Rapids Griffins players
Ice hockey players at the 2018 Winter Olympics
Living people
London Knights players
Medalists at the 2018 Winter Olympics
Muskegon Fury players
Olympic bronze medalists for Canada
Olympic ice hockey players of Canada
Olympic medalists in ice hockey
Ottawa Senators draft picks
Ottawa Senators players
Sportspeople from Clarington
Ice hockey people from Toronto
Stanley Cup champions
Sudbury Wolves players
Toronto Marlboros players
Canadian expatriate ice hockey players in Switzerland